Tattersall may refer to:

People
 Alfred John Tattersall (1861–1951), New Zealand photographer
 David Tattersall, British cinematographer
 Gale Tattersall (born 1948), British-American film maker and cinematographer
 Geoffrey Tattersall, judge on the Isle of Man
 Geoffry Tattersall (1882–1972), English cricketer
 George Tattersall (1817–1849), English sporting artist
 Henry Tattersall (1892–1971), New Zealand cricketer
 Ian Tattersall, American paleoanthropologist and curator
 John Lincoln Tattersall (1865–1942), English cotton merchant
 John Tattersall (1850-1937), English Manufacturer
 Jonathan Tattersall (born 1994), English cricketer
 Kathleen Tattersall (1942–2013), British educationalist
 Mark Tattersall (born c. 1984), British journalist
 Philippa Tattersall (born 1975), Royal Marine officer
 Richard Tattersall (1724–1795), founder of racehorse auctioneer Tattersalls
 Roy Tattersall (1922–2011), English cricketer
 Thomas Tattersall (c. 1874–1905), English murderer
 Wally Tattersall (1888–1968), English football player
 Walter Medley Tattersall (1882–1943), English zoologist and marine biologist
 William Tattersall, English football player
 Viva Tattersall, Actress
 Zoe Tattersall, fictional character in the soap opera Coronation Street

Horse racing
 Somerville Tattersall Stakes, a horse race in England
 Tattersalls Gold Cup, a horse race in Ireland
 Tattersalls Park, a racecourse in Tasmania
 Tattersalls, an English auctioneer of race horses
 Tattersall's Limited, an Australian gambling company (1895-2005) now Tatts Group

Clothing
 Tattersall (cloth), a checked pattern woven into cloth

Clubs
 City Tattersalls Club, a social club in Sydney, Australia
 Tattersalls Club, an historic building in Brisbane, Australia, previously a sporting venue
 Tattersall Golf Club in Pennsylvania, now known as Broad Run Golfer's Club
 South Australian Tattersalls Club

Places
 Tattersall Farm, in Haverhill, Massachusetts
 Tattersall Farm, in Lancashire, England